The Canadian Film Festival, formerly known as the Canadian Filmmakers Festival, is an annual film festival in Toronto, Ontario. Showcasing a program of Canadian independent films, it is held in March of each year and usually runs for five days. 

The festival was launched in 2004, and ran annually until 2008 at the Royal Cinema. Although not staged between 2009 and 2011, it was relaunched in 2012 and has run annually since. The festival has been staged at the Scotiabank Theatre since 2017.

The festival was formed in association with the Toronto International Film Festival Group, but operates independently of TIFF. It serves commonly, but not exclusively, as the Toronto premiere venue for films which premiered elsewhere on the Canadian or international film festival circuits in the previous year but have not yet screened in Toronto, although it also serves as the premiere venue for some films.

The 2020 festival was cancelled due to the COVID-19 pandemic in Canada; instead, the organizers partnered with the pay TV service Super Channel to provide television and streaming broadcasts of the films that had been slated to screen at the festival. With the pandemic continuing into 2021, festival organizers again partnered with Super Channel to present the 2021 edition of the festival under the same model.

Award for Best Feature Film

Films

2016

Features
20 Moves — Harv Glazer
Across the Line — Director X
Borealis — Sean Garrity
Dead Rush — Zach Ramelan
How to Plan an Orgy in a Small Town — Jeremy LaLonde
Jackie Boy — Cody Campanale
The Sabbatical — Brian Stockton

Shorts

2017

Features
An American Dream — Ken Finkleman
Badsville — April Mullen
Broken — Lynne Spencer
Broken Mile — Justin McConnell
Edging — Natty Zavitz
Filth City — Andy King
Great Great Great — Adam Garnet Jones
The Heretics — Chad Archibald
Lost Solace — Chris Scheuerman
Modern Classic — J.M.B. Hunter

Shorts

2018

Features
Becoming Burlesque — Jackie English
The Cannon — Marshall Axani
The Drawer Boy — Arturo Pérez Torres, Aviva Armour-Ostroff
The Go-Getters — Jeremy LaLonde
Love Jacked — Alfons Adetuyi
Luba — Caley Wilson
Ordinary Days — Kris Booth, Renuka Jeyapalan, Jordan Canning
Prodigals — Michelle Ouellet
Room for Rent — Matthew Atkinson
A Swinger's Weekend — Jon E. Cohen

Shorts

2019

Features
Creep Nation — John Geddes
The Dancing Dogs of Dombrova — Zack Bernbaum
Honey Bee — Rama Rau
Nose to Tail — Jesse Zigelstein
Nowhere — Thomas Michael
Pond Life — Gord Rand
Red Rover — Shane Belcourt
This Is North Preston — Jaren Hayman
Wolves Unleashed: Against All Odds — Andrew Simpson

Shorts

Awards

2020

Features
Alone Across the Arctic — Francis Luta
Clapboard Jungle — Justin McConnell
The Cuban — Sergio Navarretta
Hazy Little Thing — Sam Coyle
A Perfect Plan — Jesse Ikeman
Queen of the Morning Calm — Gloria Ui Young Kim
Shoot to Marry — Steve Markle
Volition — Tony Dean Smith

Shorts

Unscreened
Several films had been planned for the festival lineup, but were not able to be screened due to the shift from physical to broadcast screening. However, the films were still screened for the jury, and remained eligible for the festival awards.
All About Who You Know — Jake Horowitz
Nail in the Coffin: The Fall and Rise of Vampiro — Michael Paszt
Unidentified Woman — Katrina Saville
You Hired a Hitman — Ravi Steve

Awards

2021

Features
Between Waves — Virginia Abramovich
Chained — Titus Heckel
The Corruption of Divine Providence — Jeremy Torrie
Events Transpiring Before, During and After a High School Basketball Game — Ted Stenson
Mad Dog and the Butcher (Les Derniers vilains) — Thomas Rinfret
Range Roads — Kyle Thomas
Sugar Daddy — Wendy Morgan
White Elephant — Andrew Chung
Woman in Car — Vanya Rose

Shorts

Awards

2022

Features
Ashgrove — Jeremy LaLonde
Beneath the Surface — Marie-Geneviève Chabot
Carmen — Valerie Buhagiar
The Last Mark — Reem Morsi
The Long Rider — Sean Cisterna
The Noise of Engines (Le Bruit des moteurs) — Philippe Grégoire
A Small Fortune — Adam Perry
Tehranto — Faran Moradi
Tenzin — Michael LeBlanc, Josh Reichmann
We're All in This Together — Katie Boland

Shorts

Awards

2023

Features
Babysitter — Monia Chokri
Bloom (Jouvencelles) — Fanie Pelletier
Bystanders — Koumbie
Golden Delicious — Jason Karman
How to Get Your Parents to Divorce (Pas d'chicane dans ma cabane!) — Sandrine Brodeur-Desrosiers
Polarized — Shamim Sarif
Retrograde — Adrian Murray
Streams Flow from a River — Christopher Yip
When Time Got Louder — Connie Cocchia
Wintertide — John Barnard

Shorts

Gallery

References

External links
 Canadian Film Festival

Film festivals in Toronto
Film festivals established in 2004
2004 establishments in Canada